The 1951 Arizona State Sun Devils football team was an American football team that represented Arizona State College (later renamed Arizona State University) in the Border Conference during the 1951 college football season. In their first season under head coach Larry Siemering, the Sun Devils compiled a 6–3–1 record (4–1 against Border opponents) and outscored their opponents by a combined total of 308 to 176.

Schedule

References

Arizona State
Arizona State Sun Devils football seasons
Arizona State Sun Devils football